Rohit Bhaker (born 26 October 1984) is an Indian deaf badminton player.

Biography 
Rohit Bhaker was born profoundly deaf and he has the inability to speak. He is from Bhiwani and is currently residing in Bhiwani for badminton practices and works in HVPNL. In 1997 for his achievement in his debut Deaflympic event (1997), he was awarded the National Child Award for Exceptional Achievement, an Indian national award to child artists who perform exception achievements in any field. He also received Arjuna Award for his efforts in the sport of badminton.

Career 
Rohit made his Deaflympic debut in the 1997 Summer Deaflympics at the age of just twelve and was a member of the Indian badminton team which won the gold medal in the mixed team event, which also featured Rajeev Bagga. This achievement made him the youngest male medalist at the Deaflympic history (12 years, 8 months and 17 days) and also became the youngest gold medalist in the history of Deaflympics.

Rohit Bhaker too claimed bronze medals in the men's singles and mixed team events as a part of the 2005 Summer Deaflympics.

He is often compared to Rajeev Bagga, a fellow Indian deaf badminton player who has clinched 12 gold medals at the Deaflympics.

References 

1984 births
Living people
Indian male badminton players
Deaf badminton players
People from Bhiwani
Indian deaf people
Recipients of the Arjuna Award